Frankie Gavin is a fiddle player of traditional Irish music.

Early years

Frankie Gavin was born in 1956 in Corrandulla, County Galway, from a musical family; his parents and siblings being players of the fiddle and accordion. As a child he played the tin whistle from the age of four and, later, the flute. He received some formal training in music, but his musical ability on the fiddle is mainly self-taught. When 17 years old, he gained first place in both the All Ireland Under-18 Fiddle and Flute competitions.

Music career

In the early 1970s Gavin played musical sessions at Galway's Cellar Bar, with Alec Finn (bouzouki, guitar), Mickey Finn (fiddle), Charlie Piggott (banjo), and Johnnie (Ringo) McDonagh (bodhrán). In 1974, from these and further sessions, he founded the group De Dannan with Alec Finn.

When De Dannan split-up in 2003, Gavin founded a new group, Frankie Gavin and The New De Dannan, which led to an acrimonious exchange between Gavin and Finn. In a Hot Press interview, Alec Finn noted that the new group was not De Dannan and that he himself, Alec Finn, had registered the De Dannan name after the split in 2003.

Gavin has played and recorded with Andy Irvine, The Rolling Stones, Elvis Costello, Stéphane Grappelli, and Frankie Goes to Hollywood, and in 2010 became reputedly the fastest fiddle-player in the world, with an entry in the Guinness Book of Records.

Selected discography

Solo
 Up and Away (1995) 
 Frankie Gavin (1997)
 Frankie Goes to Town (1999)
 Shamrocks & Holly: An Irish Christmas Celebration (1999) 
 Fierce Traditional (2001)

With Alec Finn
 Frankie Gavin & Alec Finn (1977)
 Traditional Irish Music on Fiddle and Bouzouki, Volume II (2018)

With Andy Irvine
 Rainy Sundays... Windy Dreams (1980)

With Elvis Costello
 Spike (1989)

With Stéphane Grappelli
 Stéphane Grappelli in Concert with guest Frankie Gavin (1993) DVD

With The Rolling Stones
 Voodoo Lounge (1994)

With Arty McGlynn (guitar) & Aidan Coffey (accordion)
 Irlande (1994) / Ireland (1997) (live recording at Radio France, Studio 104, Paris, France) 

With Sharon Shannon
 Tunes (2007)

With Hibernian Rhapsody
 The Full Score (2008)

With Rick Epping & Jim Foley
 Jiggin' the Blues (2008)

With Paul Brock
 Omos Do Joe Cooley: A Tribute to Joe Cooley (2009)

With Roaring 20s Irish Orchestra
 By Heck: A Toast to the 1920s (2018)

With De Dannan
De Danann (1975)
The 3rd Irish Folk Festival In Concert (1976)
Selected Jigs Reels and Songs (1977)
The Mist Covered Mountain (1980)
Star-Spangled Molly (1981) (see The De Dannan Collection)
Best of De Dannan (1981)
Song For Ireland (1983)
The Irish RM (1984)
Anthem (1985)
Ballroom (1987)
A Jacket of Batteries (1988)
Half Set in Harlem (1991)
Hibernian Rhapsody (1995)
De Dannan Collection (1997) 
How the West Was Won (1999)
Welcome to the Hotel Connemara (2000)
Jigs, Reels & Rock n' Roll (2012)
Jigs & Jazz II (2014)

References

External links
Galway Advertiser: Frankie Gavin search results, retrieved 27 February 2011
The Fiddler's Almanac: Ryan J. Thomson, retrieved 27 February 2011
allcelticmusic.com: biography, retrieved 27 February 2011
folkworld.de: Frankie Gavin reviews, retrieved 27 February 2011
Camden New Journal review 2009: "Irish set fiddles on fire", retrieved 27 February 2011
irishmusicmagazine.com:  Frankie Gavin with Hibernian Rhapsody, retrieved 27 February 2011
taramusic.com: Frankie Gavin record label unlinked third party reviews , retrieved 27 February 2011
taramusic.com: Frankie Gavin record label biography , retrieved 27 February 2011
taramusic.com: Frankie Gavin record label – Hibernian Rhapsody , retrieved 27 February 2011
peoplesrepublicofcork.com: Frankie Gavin and the Hibernian Rhapsody, retrieved 27 February 2011

1956 births
Date of birth missing (living people)
Living people
Irish fiddlers
Irish folk musicians
Musicians from County Galway
De Dannan members
21st-century violinists